The Virginia Cavaliers women's basketball team represents the University of Virginia in women's basketball. The school competes in the Atlantic Coast Conference in Division I of the National Collegiate Athletic Association (NCAA). The Cavaliers play home basketball games at John Paul Jones Arena in Charlottesville, Virginia. They are currently coached by Amaka Agugua-Hamilton, who was hired on March 21, 2022.

Season records since 1990
The Cavaliers reached the Final Four in three consecutive seasons, reaching the title game in 1991, losing 70–67 to Tennessee in overtime.

NCAA tournament results
The Cavaliers have appeared in 25 NCAA Tournaments, with a record of 34-25.

References

External links